Gombhira (or gambhira or gamvira) is a type of song originating in the Bengal region in the eastern part of the Indian subcontinent, what is today northeastern  West Bengal, India and northwestern Bangladesh.

In West Bengal (India), gombhira performances are centred around the Malda District whereas Chapai Nawabganj District is the main centre of Gambhira performances in Bangladesh. The tradition is also popular in the nearby districts of Rajshahi and Naogaon. It is performed with a particularly distinctive rhythm and dance with two performers, always personifying a man and his maternal grandfather, discussing a topic to raise social awareness.

Gambhira mask 
The Gambhira dance is performed all over the Malda district of North Bengal during the festival of Chaitra Sankranti. The masks are made out of neem and fig trees by the local Sutradhar community. Sometimes they were also made the mask of clay. The three-dimensional crowns are the specialty of these masks. First, the facial features are carved out from a piece of wood and then coloured according to the character. This mask dance performed with Gombhira song. The songs of Gambhira originated among the Hindu community of Maldah in West Bengal, completely in its theme formation.

See also
 Masks of West Bengal
 Folk Music Festivals in Bangladesh

References

External links
  Gomvira song performed by Chapai Nakshi Gomvira teem 

Bangladeshi music
Asian dances
Song forms
Music of Bengal
Folk dances of West Bengal
Bengali music